During the 1908–09 English football season, Brentford competed in the Southern League First Division. A disastrous season ended with a bottom-place finish, but the club was spared relegation after the First Division was expanded in June 1909.

Season summary 

After encountering severe financial problems during the 1907–08 season, the Brentford committee was forced to dispense with the majority of the first team squad in May 1908, due to many of the players being unwilling to accept lower wages for the 1908–09 season. Top-scorer Adam Bowman had been sold in April and he was followed out of Griffin Park by Tosher Underwood, Jock Watson, Jock Hamilton, Tom McAllister, George Parsonage, Fred Corbett, Jimmy Tomlinson, Andy Clark, John Montgomery, Vince Hayes and Patsy Hendren, while Oakey Field (who had returned in November 1907), Charlie Williams and Jimmy Jay elected to retire. Fred Halliday was appointed Brentford manager on 24 June and began assembling an almost entirely new squad, which eventually reduced the wage bill by 20%, to £2,565 across the entire season (equivalent to £ in ).

Brentford endured a forgettable Southern League First Division season, matching the 33 points won during the previous season, but instead finishing five places lower at the bottom of the table. The return of Jimmy Jay in October helped solidify the back lines, which up to that point were leaking goals. Forward Alex McCulloch, signed during the 1908 off-season, caught the eye of manager Halliday's former club Bradford Park Avenue and departed for a £350 fee in November, with Geordie Reid arriving at Griffin Park in part-exchange. Reid would top-score for the Bees during the season with 18 goals. There was some cheer late in the season, with the Bees winning the Southern Professional Charity Cup.

Brentford's bottom-place finish was initially no cause for concern, with plans afoot for 16 Southern League clubs, plus another two from a list of six (which included Brentford), to form a Third Division of the Football League. The chance fell through when the Football League First and Second Division clubs voted against the formation of a Third Division, but Brentford were saved from relegation when the Southern League opted to expand to 22 clubs in June 1909, with Croydon Common being promoted from the Second Division and thus preserving Brentford's First Division status.

League table

Results
Brentford's goal tally listed first.

Legend

Southern League First Division

FA Cup 

 Source: 100 Years of Brentford

Playing squad

Left club during season

 Source: 100 Years of Brentford

Coaching staff

Statistics

Appearances

Goalscorers 

Players listed in italics left the club mid-season.
Source: 100 Years Of Brentford

Management

Summary

References 

Brentford F.C. seasons
Brentford